The Cincinnati Excite were a semi-professional indoor soccer club which played in the American Indoor Soccer League.

History 
The Excite are owned by David Galus, and took the American Indoor Soccer League season championship in the 2005/2006 season.

A number of Excite players took to the pitch during the summer of 2006 with the teams in the United Soccer Leagues. Five Excite (Marcel Matis, Salvatore Fiore, Michael McGinlay, John McGinlay, and Tiest Sondaal) players signed up with the Cincinnati Kings in the USL Second Division; while fellow Excite teammate, Connally Edozien joined the Rochester Raging Rhinos of the USL First Division. Michael McGinlay joined Bohemians F.C. in the League of Ireland during the summer of 2007.

In 2008 the Excite decided to take off for the 2008-2009 year, but never found another league. Most of the personnel transitioned to the new 1790 Cincinnati of the Professional Arena Soccer League.

Year-by-Year

References

External links 
 The Excite Homepage

E
Soccer clubs in Ohio
Indoor soccer clubs in the United States
American Indoor Soccer League teams
2004 establishments in Ohio
2008 disestablishments in Ohio
Association football clubs established in 2004
Association football clubs disestablished in 2008